Mama Insurance is a 2012 Nigerian film about a landlord who is harsh on her tenants. It was shot on Victoria Island. It was directed by Bayo Tijani and produced by Liz Da-Silva.

Cast 
Fathia Balogun
Iyabo Ojo
Ayo Mogaji
Lanre Hassan
Liz Da-Silva
Odusanya
Doris Simeon

Synopsis 
The movie is about a strict landlady whose tenants are all women of different profession and lifestyle. Her love for one of them caused her trouble as she is a fraudster.

Award 
Ayo Mogaji was nominated for the best actress in the supporting role for the film at the YMAA held in 2014.

See also 

 Fathia Williams
 Odunlade Adekola
 Shola Arikusa (film)

References 

2012 films
Yoruba-language films
Nigerian drama films